Luckiest Girl Alive is a 2022 mystery thriller film directed by Mike Barker from a screenplay by Jessica Knoll, based on her 2015 novel of the same name. The film stars Mila Kunis, Finn Wittrock, Scoot McNairy, Chiara Aurelia, Justine Lupe, Thomas Barbusca, Jennifer Beals, and Connie Britton.

Luckiest Girl Alive was released in select cinemas on September 30, 2022, before its streaming release on October 7, 2022, by Netflix.

Plot
In 2015, 35-year-old Tiffani "Ani" Fanelli, a respected New York women's magazine editor, appears to have a picture-perfect life. As she prepares to marry her fiancé, Luke Harrison, Ani meets with Aaron Wickersham, a documentary director who wants to make a short film about the school shooting she survived as a teenager. He informs her that a former classmate, Dean Barton, who went on to become a successful writer and advocate for gun control, has agreed to take part. Ani declines to be involved.

Luke informs Ani that his firm has offered him an opportunity to move to London and suggests Ani can take an MFA program there to allow her to write for herself. She agrees, despite having hopes of someday working at The New York Times. They later have dinner with a couple Luke knows; the husband turns out to be Ani's former teacher, Andrew Larson.

In flashbacks to 1999, Ani is seen joining the prestigious Brentley School, where she quickly befriends a clique of popular students, including Dean and his friends Liam and Peyton. Over the course of the film, it is revealed that Ani was gang-raped at a party by all three boys while intoxicated. She shared what happened with Mr. Larson, who encouraged her to tell her eccentric mother, Dina, but Ani refused. However, she told her friend Arthur, who had been continuously bullied by the three boys.

Ani's past slowly starts to haunt her, which begins to affect her relationship with Luke. Aaron tells Ani that Dean wants to meet with her to apologize on camera; she agrees, under the condition that Aaron keeps them separate until she is ready. Meanwhile, Ani struggles with her strained relationship with her mother Dina, who claims she always found Ani difficult and alludes that she is only marrying Luke for his money.

At the documentary filming, Dean shows up unexpectedly early and Ani flees in a panic. Flashbacks see young Ani struggling to deal with the trauma of what happened to her, and not long after, the school shooting took place, perpetrated by Arthur and his friend Ben. Peyton and Liam were killed, and Dean was wounded severely and left unable to walk. Prior to the funerals, Dean started a rumor that Ani slept with him and helped Arthur and Ben plan the shooting because he did not want to be her boyfriend. Ani is consequently shunned by everyone, including Dina, who blamed her for causing her own rape by drinking and partying excessively.

Back in 2015, at the publishing of his new book, Ani meets with Dean, who shows little remorse for what he did and threatens to recapitulate his story of her participation in the shooting if she tells anyone. However, after being confronted by Ani during the conversation, Dean admits he raped her. Having secretly recorded their conversation, Ani leaves. She decides to share her experience after encouragement from her boss and ends up writing a piece for The New York Times.

At their rehearsal dinner, Ani receives the final article, which is about to be published, much to Luke's dismay, who says he wishes she had dealt with it privately. Ani then confesses she has been using him to hide from her past and decides not to marry him. Ani finally begins to move on; she receives an overwhelming reaction from other women who tell her their stories of sexual assault, as she begins her career at The New York Times.

Cast

Production
In August 2015, it was announced Lionsgate had acquired film rights to Luckiest Girl Alive by Jessica Knoll, with Reese Witherspoon set to produce under her Pacific Standard banner. It was scrapped, however, due to scheduling conflicts and poor budgeting. In February 2021, it was announced the film would be happening with Mila Kunis starring and Mike Barker set to direct. Netflix was to distribute. In July 2021, Finn Wittrock, Scoot McNairy, Chiara Aurelia, Thomas Barbusca, Justine Lupe, Dalmar Abuzied, Alex Barone, Carson MacCormac, Jennifer Beals, and Connie Britton joined the cast.

Principal photography began June 2021 in Toronto, Canada, and ended in September 2021 in New York City, USA.

Release
Luckiest Girl Alive was released in select cinemas on September 30, 2022, before its streaming release on October 7, 2022, by Netflix.

Reception

References

External links
 
 
 

2022 thriller films
2020s American films
2020s Australian films
2020s English-language films
2020s mystery thriller films
American mystery thriller films
Australian mystery thriller films
English-language Netflix original films
Films about rape in the United States
Films about school violence
Films based on American novels
Films based on mystery novels
Films directed by Mike Barker
Films set in 1999
Films set in 2015
Films set in New York City
Films shot in New York City
Films shot in Toronto
Made Up Stories films
Works about magazine publishing